Cortinarius catarracticus is a species of potentially lethal fungus in the family Cortinariaceae native to South Australia.

References

catarracticus
Fungi described in 2004
Fungi native to Australia